181 West Madison Street is a skyscraper located in Chicago managed and leased by MB Real Estate. Built in 1990, the building is 680 feet (207 m) tall and contains 50 floors. It is architect Cesar Pelli's first and only completed tower in the city.

The building was constructed by Miglin-Beitler Developments.

The glassy office tower's most distinctive feature is its recessed crown. The top of the building is illuminated white at the corners, as well as other various colors depending on the holiday.

In 1989, the same combination of developer (Miglin-Beitler Developments) and architect envisioned the Miglin-Beitler Skyneedle nearby. The 2,000 foot (610 m) and 125-story building would have been the tallest skyscraper in the world if completed, but plans were scrapped because of a sluggish real estate market.

Tenants
Cornerstone Research
Marmon Group
One Medical Group
Northern Trust
Quantitative Risk Management
United States Citizenship and Immigration Services

See also
Eliel Saarinen's Tribune Tower design
List of skyscrapers
List of tallest buildings in the United States
List of tallest buildings in Chicago
World's tallest structures

References

External links

Official website

César Pelli buildings
Skyscraper office buildings in Chicago
Office buildings completed in 1990
1990 establishments in Illinois